Changxing South railway station is a railway station in Changxing County, Huzhou, Zhejiang, China. It is an intermediate stop on the Xuancheng–Hangzhou railway and is also the southern terminus of the Xinyi–Changxing railway.

History
The station building was rebuilt in 2005. On 20 June 2012, the name of the station was changed from Changxing to Changxing South, in preparation for the opening of the new Changxing railway station.

References 

Railway stations in Zhejiang